Stone Bracelet is a public art work by artist Zoran Mojsilov, located on the south side of Milwaukee, Wisconsin.  The work is a large chiseled stone fitted with a stainless steel loop near its top from which smaller rocks are suspended on four sides of the sculpture. The artwork is located in a small park near Third and Walker Streets in the Walker's Point neighborhood. Stone Bracelet was commissioned through the Spirit of Milwaukee Neighborhood Millennium Art Initiative.

References

Outdoor sculptures in Milwaukee
2000 sculptures